The 2007 British Speedway Championship was the 47th edition of the British Speedway Championship. The Final took place on 4 June at Monmore Green in Wolverhampton, England. The Championship was won by Chris Harris, who beat David Howe, Scott Nicholls and Edward Kennett in the final heat.

Final 
4 June 2007
 Monmore Green Stadium, Wolverhampton <

{| width=100%
|width=50% valign=top|

Qualifying

Semi-final

Final

See also 
 British Speedway Championship

References 

British Speedway Championship
Great Britain
2007 in British sport